On 5 October 1987, 12 Tamil Tigers who were taken into custody by the Sri Lankan Navy committed suicide. They were brought to Sri Lankan Army base in Palali with 5 other unrelated individuals. When Sri Lankan Army attempted to take them to Colombo for interrogation, the 12 committed suicide by swallowing cyanide capsules.

This incident happened two months after the Indian Peace Keeping Force arrived in the northeast of Sri Lanka under the Indo-Sri Lanka Accord. The suicide triggered an anti-Sinhalese pogrom in the Eastern Province carried out by the Tamil nationalist militant groups.

See also

 Ponnuthurai Sivakumaran
 IPKF
 Operation Pawan
 Jaffna hospital massacre
 1989 Valvettiturai massacre

References

 

Liberation Tigers of Tamil Eelam
History of Sri Lanka (1948–present)
1987 in Sri Lanka

Mass suicides
Indian Peace Keeping Force